Spinsters' Rock is a Neolithic dolmen near Drewsteignton in Devon. It is situated on Shilstone Farm west of the village. It is near the A382 road. The dolmen collapsed in 1862 but was restored in the same year. No finds were recorded.

There are 18th-century antiquarian reports of nearby stone circles and alignments. These reports are considered to be of "dubious accuracy". There are some free-standing stones located nearby, although only two align with Spinsters' Rock.

Notes

Dolmens in England
Archaeological sites in Devon
Buildings and structures in Devon
Tourist attractions in Devon